The York Militia was a volunteer militia unit in Upper Canada formed after the passage of the Militia Act of 1793. Members of the York Militia were drawn from the settlers of York County, an area mostly made up of present-day Greater Toronto.

The Militia consisted of 3 line infantry regiments:

 1st Regiment of York Militia
 2nd Regiment of York Militia
 3rd Regiment of York Militia - recruited around the present-day York Region (Markham), Toronto (Scarborough, old Town of York later as Toronto, Etobicoke) and Durham (Pickering and Whitby). The regiment can be partially traced back to John Button's 1st York Light Dragoons (c. 1810) from Markham, Ontario.

The three regiments of the York Militia fought in several engagements during the War of 1812.

The 1st Regiment of the York Militia was involved at the Siege of Fort Mackinac, the Siege of Detroit, the Battle of Queenston Heights, and the Battle of York.

The 2nd Regiment of the York Militia fought at Detroit, Queenston Heights, and at the Battle of Lundy's Lane

The 3rd Regiment of the York Militia fought at Detroit, Queenston Heights, and York. Within the Canadian Army, the 1st and 3rd Regiments of York Militia are perpetuated by the Queen's York Rangers while the 2nd Regiment is perpetuated by the Royal Hamilton Light Infantry.

See also
 Canadian units of the War of 1812

References

Military history of Canada
Canadian military units and formations of the War of 1812
Queen's York Rangers (1st American Regiment)
Royal Hamilton Light Infantry (Wentworth Regiment)